Helmut Sandmann (born 21 December 1944) is a retired German football player. He spent 10 seasons in the Bundesliga with Hamburger SV.

Honours
 UEFA Cup Winners' Cup finalist: 1967–68
 DFB-Pokal finalist: 1966–67

References

External links
 

1944 births
Living people
German footballers
Hamburger SV players
Bundesliga players
2. Bundesliga players
Footballers from Hamburg
Association football defenders
West German footballers